Phadke is a surname native to the Indian state of Maharashtra. It is found among Chitpavan Brahmin and Deshastha Rigvedi Brahmin (DRB) communities.

Notable people
Arun G. Phadke – electrical engineer, professor at Virginia Tech
Dattatraya Yeshwant Phadke – scientist at Tata Institute of Fundamental Research, awarded Padma Bhushan 
Kishor Phadke – psychologist 
Mrudula Phadke – Vice Chancellor of the Maharashtra University of Health Sciences
N S Phadke – Marathi writer
Raghunath Krishna Phadke (1884–1972) – sculptor 
Sudhir Phadke – singer, music director, writer
Shridhar Phadke – son of Sudhir Phadke, music director and DGM in Air India
Vasudev Balwant Phadke (1845–1883) – freedom fighter
Vinod Phadke – politician and cricket administrator
Vitthal Laxman Phadke – social worker. awarded Padma Bhushan 
Y D Phadke – historian, writer and activist

References